Eastlawn Records is an independent blues and jazz record label based in Detroit, Michigan United States. Co-founded in 1990 by RJ Spangler and Frank Traum, major artists include Alberta Adams, Planet D Nonet, RJ Spangler's Blue Four, and Gino Parks.

History

Founding

Eastlawn Records was founded in Detroit, Michigan in 1990, when drummer and bandleader RJ Spangler teamed up with an old friend from high school, Frank Traum. The name Eastlawn Records came from the Detroit street where Traum's father was raised, as a tribute to him. Spangler had also lived on Eastlawn Street in the late 1970s.

Traum, a local pharmacist, felt that friends of his, members of the Sun Sounds Orchestra, needed to be heard. The SSO were the first artist signed to the label, with members consisting primarily of current and past members of the Sun Messengers, another Detroit band co-founded by Spangler. Both groups shared an affection for jazz musician Sun Ra and African music.

Releases
The label's first release was a CD by the Sun Sounds Orchestra, the Afro-jazz group that Spangler was still then co-leading. The label has since released jazz, blues, soul, and some rock recordings with a focus on Detroit musicians. Among those artists are Detroit jump-blues band The Blues Disciples, who released their debut album in early 1993 on the label. Led by guitarist Paul Carey, the band also features musicians such as bassist Bob Conner on acoustic bass and R.J. Spangler on drums.

The label later signed Alberta Adams, a Detroit blues singer whose album Detroit is my Home was released exclusively on Eastlawn in 2008.

Spangler's band the Blue Four had a well-received album released in 2009, titled You Know I Can't Refuse: The Bill Heid Sessions. According to Allmusic, "Bill Heid spent some 15 years living in Metro Detroit. Drummer R.J. Spangler corralled Heid on a trip back to Detroit for this recording, showcasing the songs that Heid has performed regularly as a pianist and blues vocalist." Allmusic gave the album 4/5 stars.

In 2012 the album This Is What We Do was released on the label by the RJ Spangler Trio, Spangler's organ trio. The EP received radio airplay throughout the Midwest. Spangler is also a member of Planet D Nonet, a band signed to the label. Two of the band's numerous albums were Sun Ra tribute music.

Artists
Current
Alberta Adams
Planet D Nonet
RJ Spangler's Blue Four
RJ Spangler Trio

Past
The Blues Disciples
Geno Parks
Odessa Harris
Sun Sounds Orchestra

Discography

See also
List of record labels

References

External links
Eastlawn Records Official Web Site

 
American independent record labels
Companies based in Detroit
Record labels established in 1990